David A. McIntee (born 31 December 1968) is a British writer.

Career
McIntee has written many spin-off novels based on the BBC science fiction television series Doctor Who, as well as one each based on Final Destination and Space: 1999.  He has also written a non-fiction book on Star Trek: Voyager and one jointly on the Alien and Predator movie franchises.  He has written several audio plays, and contributed to various magazines including Dreamwatch, SFX, Star Trek Communicator, Titan's Star Trek Magazine, Death Ray, and The Official Star Wars Fact Files.  He currently writes for the UK's Asian-entertainment magazine, Neo

Between 2006 and 2008, McIntee co-edited an anthology, Shelf Life, in memory of fellow Doctor Who novelist Craig Hinton, which was published in December 2008 to raise money for the British Heart Foundation.

McIntee made the jump to Star Trek fiction in October 2007, with "On The Spot", a story in the Star Trek: The Next Generation anthology The Sky's The Limit.  This was followed with a novella in the anthology Seven Deadly Sins in March 2010.

In January 2008, Blue Water Productions began publishing The Kingdom of Hades, a comic book sequel to Ray Harryhausen's 1963 movie Jason and the Argonauts.  This is a five-issue series, though some early publicity erroneously quoted it as being four issues long.  He is following this title with a four-issue mini-series, William Shatner Presents: Quest For Tomorrow.

In 2009, Abaddon Books published McIntee's The Light of Heaven, an entry in the publisher's Twilight of Kerberos series.

In 2010, Powys Media published McIntee's novel Space: 1999 Born for Adversity.

In 2018, Obverse Books published McIntee's first non-fiction for some years, an analysis of two stories from the Sapphire and Steel television series in collaboration with his wife, Lesley, as part of their Silver Archive series of monographs.

Doctor Who: Avatar
In mid 1989, McIntee wrote a three-part serial entitled Doctor Who: Avatar, is a story that features the Doctor and Ace encounter a zombie invasion during a Lovecraftian horror experimentation in 1927.

This story was submitted for Season 27 of the program, but was announced in September 1989, the BBC would cancel Doctor Who entirely after airing its 26 season, due to the show having low ratings.

In June 1993, McIntee adapted the story as Doctor Who: White Darkness, novelized by Virgin Publishing's.

Bibliography

Doctor Who

Virgin New Adventures
 White Darkness (1993)
 First Frontier (1994)
 Sanctuary (1995)

Virgin Missing Adventures
 Lords of the Storm (1995)
 The Shadow of Weng-Chiang (1996)
 The Dark Path (1997)

Past Doctor Adventures
 The Face of the Enemy (1998)
 Mission: Impractical (1998)
 The Wages of Sin (1999)
 Bullet Time (2001)
 The Eleventh Tiger (2004)

Eighth Doctor Adventures
 Autumn Mist (1999)

Star Trek
 The Sky's The Limit story: "On The Spot". (Pocket Books, 2007)
 Seven Deadly Sins novella: Reservoir Ferengi. (Pocket Books, 2010)
 Indistinguishable From Magic. (Pocket Books, 2011)

Final Destination
 Destination Zero (2005)

Space: 1999
 Born For Adversity (2010)

Other novels
 Twilight of Kerberos: The Light of Heaven. (Abaddon Books, 2009)

Non-fiction
 Delta Quadrant: The Unofficial Guide to Voyager (Virgin Books, 2000)
 Beautiful Monsters: The Unofficial and Unauthorised Guide to the Alien and Predator Films (Telos, 272 pages, 2005)
 The Silver Archive #1:Sapphire and Steel Assignments 1 & 2  (2018)

Comics
 Ray Harryhausen Presents: Jason and the Argonauts – The Kingdom of Hades (with Randy Kintz, 5-issue limited series, Bluewater Productions, November 2007–)
 William Shatner Presents: Quest For Tomorrow (4-issue miniseries, Bluewater Productions, 2010)

Audios

Big Finish audio plays
 Excelis Rising (2002)
 Unregenerate! (2005)

Other audio plays
 The Quality of Mercy'' (BBV, 2003)

References

External links
 
 Blog

Interviews

1968 births
Living people
British comics writers
British science fiction writers
Place of birth missing (living people)
Writers of Doctor Who novels
20th-century British novelists
21st-century British novelists
20th-century British male writers
21st-century British male writers